Gilda (born Rosangela Scalabrino on May 31, 1950) is an Italian singer. In 1975 she won the Sanremo Music Festival with the song "Ragazza del sud".

Born in Masserano, Gilda started her career as the vocalist in a local band. After failing to qualify in a previous edition of the festival, she debuted at the 25th edition of the Sanremo Music Festival and won the competition with a song composed by herself, "Ragazza del sud", which was heavily criticized for its anti-feminist lyrics.

After a few further singles, Gilda got married and started managing a hotel in Turin, abandoning the showbusinnes except for a few occasional live performances.

References 

Italian pop singers
Italian women singers
1950 births
Living people
People from the Province of Biella
Sanremo Music Festival winners